The 1924 Chico State Wildcats football team represented Chico State Teachers College—now known as California State University, Chico—as a member of the California Coast Conference (CCC) during the 1924 college football season. Led by second-year head coach Art Acker, Chico State compiled an overall record of 7–2 with a mark of 2–0 in conference play, winning the CCC North Division title. The Wildcats played the champion of the South Division, Fresno State, in the conference championship game on December 6. The Wildcats won the game, 16–0, to claim the conference title. The team outscored its opponents 155 to 35 for the season and had six shutout victories. The Wildcats played home games at College Field in Chico, California.

Schedule

Notes

References

Chico State
Chico State Wildcats football seasons
California Coast Conference football champion seasons
Chico State Wildcats football